The Memorial Home Community Historic District (also known as Penney Retirement Community) is a U.S. historic district (designated as such on February 3, 1999) located in Penney Farms, Florida. The district is bounded by SR 16, Caroline Boulevard, Wilbanks Avenue, and Studio Road. It contains 24 historic buildings and 2 structures.

References

External links
 Clay County listings at National Register of Historic Places
 Penney Retirement Community

National Register of Historic Places in Clay County, Florida
Historic districts on the National Register of Historic Places in Florida